The many-colored bushshrike or many-coloured bushshrike (Chlorophoneus multicolor) is a species of bird in the bushshrike family, Malaconotidae.

The black-fronted bushshrike (C. nigrifrons) of southern and eastern Africa is sometimes included in this species.

It is sparsely present across the African tropical rainforest.

 C. m. multicolor (Gray, GR, 1845)	— Sierra Leone to Cameroon ;		
 C. m. batesi Sharpe, 1908	— southern Cameroon to western Uganda and northwestern Angola ;		
 C. m. graueri (Hartert, 1908) — Albertine Rift montane forests.

Its natural habitats are subtropical or tropical dry forests, subtropical or tropical moist lowland forests, and subtropical or tropical moist montane forests.

References

 Sinclair, Ian & Ryan, Peter (2003) Birds of Africa south of the Sahara, Struik, Cape Town.

many-colored bushshrike
Birds of the African tropical rainforest
many-colored bushshrike
many-colored bushshrike
Taxonomy articles created by Polbot